Atvan is a village in Mawal taluka of Pune district in the state of Maharashtra, India.

Tourism in Atvan- Somjai matta temple, Lionspoint, Tigerpoint, Tigerfall, Shivling point.
Committee established in Atvan - JFM Committee Atvan.
Chairperson of Atvan: Santosh Dhondu Margale

Administration
The village is administrated by a sarpanch, an elected representative who leads a gram panchayat. In 2019, the village was not itself listed as a seat of a gram panchayat, meaning that the local administration was shared with one or more other villages.

Demographics
At the 2019 Census of India, the village comprised 30 households. The population of 183 was split between 89 males and 94 females.

See also
List of villages in Mawal taluka

References

Villages in Mawal taluka